According to the American sniper Carlos Hathcock, Apache was a female sniper and interrogator for the Viet Cong during the War in Vietnam. While no real name is given by Hathcock, he states she was known by the US military as "Apache", because of her methods of torturing US Marines and ARVN troops for information and then letting them bleed to death.

She was reportedly killed in 1966 by US Marine sniper Carlos Hathcock, who was part of a Marine Corps sniper team.

Sociologist Jerry Lembcke has cast doubt on the existence of Apache and the veracity of the narratives about her, considering the story to be a legend which is designed to dehumanise Vietnamese women. Ugo Fracassa notes that Hathcock's narrative description his killing of Apache contains voyeuristic sexual undertones, and links this to American sexual violence against Vietnamese women.

Hathcock's account 
In an interview conducted by John Plaster in 1984 and 1985, Hathcock stated that Apache led a platoon of snipers near Hill 55, just outside of Da Nang near the middle of present-day Vietnam, and had tortured Marines. 

In dramatised versions of Hathcock's life story, published by Charles Henderson, Apache is described as torturing captured US soldiers within earshot of their comrades. However, academics studying the Vietnam war consider these accounts to be untrue. Hathcock´s narrative suggests he shot Apache from a distance, working with Jim Land as a spotter.

Historical perspectives 

Jerry Lembcke views the story as a legend. He points out that, although women served in various capacities in the North Vietnamese military and the Viet Cong,  there is very little evidence of women in front line combat roles during the Vietnam war, much less in positions of command. He also states that stories of Apache's alleged treatment of US prisoners are a distortion the historical record which serves to dehumanise the Vietnamese as capable of atrocities for which no evidence exists. He concludes by stating that characters such as Apache are "more likely found in the comic books than history books".

Lembcke also draws attention to the parallel between Henderson's lurid description of Apache's torture of an American marine, in which she spits betel juice in his face, and the urban legend of women spitting on returning Vietnam vets. He expands on this by suggesting that US popular culture's focus on female Vietnamese fighters forms part of a feminisation of the Vietnamese enemy and that this has become a key component in popular media and the American collective memory of Vietnam.  According to Lembcke, Apache is an fantasy springing from the psychology of defeat, in which an emasculating woman warrior symbolises the blow to male pride, sexual prowess and status associated with military failure.

Ugo Fracassa considers Henderson's recounting of Hathcock's narrative to be sexualised, given its focus on Apache's physical appearance which he views as displaying an attraction combined with repulsion. He also considers the narrative to contain aspects of voyeurism, in view of its description of Hathcock and another US Marine spying on her while she urinated. He views Hathcock's account of Apache's cruelty, involving sexualised violence against men, to be an inverted representation of the reality of American rapes and sexual violence against local women.

In popular culture 
Hathcock's account of an encounter with Apache was the basis for an episode of The History Channel documentary series Sniper: Deadliest Missions. Lebcke views the story of Apache to have been the inspiration behind the female sniper in Full Metal Jacket.

References

External links
Excerpt from The Ultimate Sniper video by Major John Plaster, YouTube

Military personnel killed in the Vietnam War
1936 births
1966 deaths
Snipers
Torture in Vietnam
Female military personnel
Torturers
Women in the Vietnam War
Viet Cong
North Vietnamese military personnel of the Vietnam War
Vietnam War crimes by the Viet Cong
Fictional Vietnamese people